Marna may refer to:

Places
Marna, Estonia, a village in Pärsti Parish in Viljandi County, Estonia
Marna, or Mandalselva, a river in Vest-Agder county, Norway
Marna, Minnesota, an unincorporated community in Faribault county, Minnesota in the United States
Marna, Sweden, part of a peninsula south of Sundsvall

Other
MV Marna, a British coaster formerly named Empire Cliff and later named Harcliff and then 
Marnas, a god worshipped in Gaza in antiquity